William Hal Ashby (September 2, 1929 – December 27, 1988) was an American film director and editor associated with the New Hollywood wave of filmmaking.

Before his career as a director Ashby edited films for Norman Jewison, notably The Russians Are Coming, the Russians Are Coming (1966), which earned Ashby an Oscar nomination for Best Editing, and In the Heat of the Night (1967), which earned him his only Oscar for the same category.

Ashby received a third Oscar nomination, this time for Best Director for Coming Home (1978).  Other films directed by Ashby include The Landlord (1970), Harold and Maude (1971), The Last Detail (1973), Shampoo (1975), Bound for Glory (1976), and Being There (1979).

Early life
Ashby was born September 2, 1929, in Ogden, Utah, the youngest of four siblings born to Mormon parents Eileen Ireta (née Hetzler) and James Thomas Ashby, a dairy farm owner. Ashby's parents divorced in 1936, after which his father remarried.

Following the divorce, Ashby and his siblings lived with their mother, briefly in Logan, Utah, before relocating to Portland, Oregon, where his elder brother took a job in the timber industry. His mother, a cooking enthusiast, opened a restaurant in Portland. After several years in Portland, the family returned to Ogden, where Ashby primarily lived with his father. When Ashby was 12 years old, his father committed suicide.

Ashby subsequently dropped out of high school. Ashby-approved studio biographies concealed this, falsely stating that he graduated from Utah State University (situated in nearby Logan, Utah) to ensure he fit into the social milieu of college-educated peers like Francis Ford Coppola and Martin Scorsese. Ashby was married and divorced by the time he was 19.

Hollywood career
As Ashby was entering adult life, he moved from Utah to Los Angeles, California, where he pursued a bohemian lifestyle and ultimately became an assistant film editor through a long apprenticeship. His career gained momentum when he served as the editor of The Loved One (1965), an adaptation of the Evelyn Waugh novel that involved such New Hollywood contemporaries as screenwriter Terry Southern and cinematographer Haskell Wexler. After being nominated for the Academy Award for Film Editing in 1967 for The Russians Are Coming, the Russians Are Coming, his big break occurred one year later when he won the award for In the Heat of the Night. Ashby often stated that the practice of editing provided him with the best filmmaking background outside traditional university study and he carried the techniques learned as an editor with him when he began directing.

At the urging of mentor Norman Jewison, Ashby directed his first film, The Landlord—an early rumination on the social dynamics of gentrification in Park Slope, Brooklyn—in 1970. While his birth date placed him within the Silent Generation, the filmmaker (who had been a habitual marijuana smoker since 1950) eagerly embraced the hippie lifestyle, adopting vegetarianism and growing his hair long before it became de rigueur.

Over the next ten years, Ashby directed several acclaimed and popular films, many were about outsiders and adventurers traversing the pathways of life. They included the off-beat romance Harold and Maude (1971), The Last Detail (1973), and the social satire Being There (1979), with Peter Sellers, giving the star a well-received role after many felt he had lapsed into self-parody. His most significant commercial success was Shampoo (1975), a collaboration with Warren Beatty and Robert Towne that satirized late-1960s sexual and social mores through the life of a hairdresser modeled after such contemporaneous figures as Jay Sebring and Jon Peters. Bound for Glory (1976), a muted biography of Woody Guthrie starring David Carradine, was the first film to utilize the Steadicam. In June 1973, Ashby was hired to direct One Flew Over the Cuckoo's Nest, though he would be replaced by Miloš Forman before filming started.

Aside from Shampoo, Ashby's most commercially successful film was the Vietnam War drama Coming Home (1978). Starring Jane Fonda and Jon Voight, both in Academy Award-winning performances, it was for this film that Ashby earned his only Best Director nomination from the Academy. Arriving in the post-Jaws and Star Wars era, Coming Home was one of the last films to encapsulate the modestly budgeted, socially realistic ethos of the New Hollywood era, earning nearly $15 million in returns and rentals on a $3 million budget.

Decline
Because of his critical success and dependable profitability, shortly after the success of Coming Home, Ashby was able to form a production company, Northstar, under the auspices of Lorimar. After Being There, Ashby became more reclusive, often retreating to his home in Malibu Colony, a gated enclave in the city. Later, it was widely rumored in a likely whisper campaign from Lorimar (whose executives clashed with the director) that Ashby had become dependent upon cocaine, a drug that he only used intermittently after the production of Bound for Glory. As a consequence of these rumors, he slowly became unemployable. Eva Gardos, an editor who worked with Ashby during the period, has asserted that his drug intake remained largely confined to marijuana and psilocybin.

Following Being There, Ashby was provisionally set to reunite with Sellers and Terry Southern on Grossing Out, a black comedy inspired by the actor's chance meeting with an international arms dealer on an airplane. Although Southern (who had not had a screenplay go to production in a decade) was rejuvenated by the prospect of working with the duo and produced a script that was said to be on par with his 1960s oeuvre, the project went into development hell after Sellers' sudden death from a heart attack in July 1980.

During this period, the productions of Second-Hand Hearts and Lookin' to Get Out—the latter a Las Vegas caper that reunited him with Voight and featured Voight's young daughter, Angelina Jolie—was plagued by the increasingly strained relationship between Ashby and Lorimar. Filmed in 1979, Second-Hand Hearts only received a poorly reviewed limited release in 1981 before being pulled from circulation for nearly thirty years. Belatedly released in October 1982, Lookin' to Get Out earned a little under $1 million in returns and rentals on an estimated $17 million budget. During this period, Lorimar executives grew less tolerant of his increasingly perfectionist production (811,000 feet of film were used shooting Lookin' to Get Out) and editing techniques; a montage in the latter film set to The Police's "Message in a Bottle" took six months to perfect but proved to be logistically unusable due to a Lorimar agreement with the American Federation of Musicians.

Initially set to helm Tootsie after two years of negotiations and Ashby-directed wig and makeup tests, Lorimar executives blocked him from working on the film because part of the preproduction period overlapped with final work on the long-gestating Lookin' to Get Out, which was eventually recut by the studio when Ashby's work was deemed to be unsatisfactory. (Decades later, Ashby's cut was rediscovered and released on DVD in 2009.) As Dustin Hoffman had not offered a "formal commitment" to the production at the time of Ashby's dismissal, the director forfeited his $1.5 million fee.

While post-production of Lookin' to Get Out continued, Lorimar permitted Ashby to film The Rolling Stones' 1981 American tour documentary, Let's Spend the Night Together; the director was a longtime fan of the group. He collapsed before the final filmed concert at Sun Devil Stadium in Tempe, Arizona, on December 13, 1981. Although Jeff Wexler said Ashby was "partying way beyond his capabilities with the Stones", Caleb Deschanel has said that Ashby (who directed the concert shoot on a gurney) simply had the flu. The film was well-received but gained little traction during a limited theatrical release. In September 1983, Ashby directed Solo Trans, a Neil Young concert video that was released the following year.

The Slugger's Wife, with a screenplay written by Neil Simon, was a critical and commercial failure. Ashby (whose cocaine use had accelerated throughout the shoot) was fired after delivering a 20-minute rough cut of the beginning of the film that included almost no dialogue. When the Oliver Stone-written 8 Million Ways to Die fared similarly at the box office, Ashby's post-production process was considered to be such a liability that he was fired by the production company on the final day of principal photography.

Attempting to turn a corner in his declining career, Ashby stopped using drugs, trimmed his hair and beard, and began to frequently attend Hollywood parties wearing a navy-blue blazer so as to suggest that he was once again employable. Despite these efforts, he could only find work as a television director, helming one of three pilots for Beverly Hills Buntz, an unsuccessful Hill Street Blues spinoff starring Dennis Franz. He also directed Jake's Journey, a sword and sorcery fantasy conceived by Graham Chapman.

Death
Longtime friend Warren Beatty advised Ashby to seek medical care after he complained of various ailments, including undiagnosed phlebitis. He was soon diagnosed with pancreatic cancer that rapidly spread to his lungs, colon, and liver. Ashby died on December 27, 1988, at his home in Malibu, California.

Acclaim and influence
The Last Detail, Bound for Glory, Coming Home, and Being There were all nominated for the Palme d'Or.

American songwriter and guitarist Guthrie Thomas, who coordinated the music in Bound for Glory and acted in the film, called Ashby "one of the finest motion picture directors of the 20th century."

For the 2012 Sight & Sound Directors Top Ten poll Niki Caro, Cyrus Frisch, and Wanuri Kahiu voted for Harold and Maude, with Frisch describing the film as "an encouragement to think beyond the obvious!"

A 2018 documentary about the director was screened at the Sundance Film Festival.

Archives
The moving image collection of Hal Ashby is held at the Academy Film Archive. The material at the Academy Film Archive is also complemented by material in the Hal Ashby papers at the Academy's Margaret Herrick Library.

Filmography

Films

Other film work

TV work

Citations

General and cited sources

External links 

Senses of Cinema: Great Directors Critical Database
The Director's Director – discussion by directors Ashby influenced
Literature on Hal Ashby
Hal Ashby in Images Film Journal – Article summarizing Ashby's career in Images Film Journal
Hal Ashby papers, Margaret Herrick Library, Academy of Motion Picture Arts and Sciences

American film editors
Artists from Ogden, Utah
1929 births
1988 deaths
American film producers
Best Film Editing Academy Award winners
Businesspeople from Ogden, Utah
Deaths from cancer in California
Deaths from pancreatic cancer
Film directors from Utah
Filmmakers from Portland, Oregon
Former Latter Day Saints
20th-century American businesspeople